Yayuk Basuki and Nana Miyagi were the defending champions, but none competed this year.

Michelle Jaggard-Lai and Rene Simpson-Alter won the title by defeating Nancy Feber and Alexandra Fusai 6–0, 7–6 in the final.

Seeds

Draw

Draw

References

External links
 Official results archive (ITF)

Taipei Women's Championship
Taipei Women's Championship
Taipei Women's Championship, 1994